Karan M. Shaner is a Canadian judge who serves as a justice on the Supreme Court of the Northwest Territories in Yellowknife, Northwest Territories. She was appointed in October 2011.

References 

Living people
Judges in the Northwest Territories
Year of birth missing (living people)